Nkrumaism (sometimes Consciencism) is an African socialist political ideology based on the thinking and writing of Kwame Nkrumah. Nkrumah, a pan-Africanist and socialist, served as Prime Minister of the Gold Coast (later Ghana) from 1952 until 1960 and subsequently as President of Ghana before being deposed by the National Liberation Council in 1966.

Definition 

Nkrumaism is a pan-African socialist theory which aims to adapt Marxist–Leninist theory to the social context of the African continent. Nkrumah defined his belief system as "the ideology of a New Africa, independent and absolutely free from imperialism, organized on a continental scale, founded upon the conception of one and united Africa, drawing its strength from modern science and technology and from the traditional African belief that the free development of each is the condition for the free development of all." The Convention People's Party (CPP), founded by Nkrumah in 1949, writes "Nkrumaism simply means Self Reliance, African is capable of managing his own affairs. The values CPP stands for or the guiding principles of Nkrumaism today are those which have guided it throughout its existence. Social justice, Pan-Africanism, Self Determination, African Personality, Anti-Imperialism."

Nkrumaism is a syncretic ideology which blends different sources together while not necessarily borrowing their entire frameworks. In his work, Nkrumah blended different sources from within Africa, the canon of Western philosophy, and black intellectuals in North America and Europe, like Marcus Garvey and George Padmore. Particularly important in founding this ideology were his study and meetings with C. L. R. James, W. E. B. Du Bois and Father Divine. Aside from the Marxist–Leninist framework, this blending of ideas largely only took bits and pieces of other philosophical systems and even its use of traditional African cultural concepts were often stretched to fit into the larger theory. While a major focus of the ideology was ending colonial relationships on the African continent, many of the ideas were utopian, diverting the scientific nature of the Marxist political analysis which it claims to support.

Beliefs 
Like other African political ideologies at the time, the central focus of Nkrumaism was on decolonization across Africa. The central contention of Nkrumaism was that African countries, united with one another, needed to adopt socialist political structures which were consistent with the traditional African values of egalitarianism. Nkrumah rejected the idealized view of pre-colonial African societies that were classless or non-hierarchical, but accepted that Africa had a spirit of communalism and humanism. While colonial structures had damaged these communal, egalitarian values, they had not fully supplanted them. Nkrumaism then argued that a return to these values through socialist political structures would both heal the disruption caused by colonial structures and allow further development of African societies. The pan-African aspects of Nkrumah's ideology were justified by a claim that all African societies had a community of economic life and that in contradiction to the neocolonial structures that replaced formal colonies, only African unity would create real autonomy.

In Nkrumah's argument, four basic pillars formed the applied aspects of this theory: state ownership of the means of production, a one-party democracy, fostering a classless economic system, and pan-African unity. While embracing much of Marxist–Leninist philosophy and Soviet political structures at the time, the ideology differed in some key respects. First, while Marxism–Leninism saw revolution as the only way to replace class structures with a socialist egalitarian system, Nkrumah saw reform as the more appropriate case for Africa. He argued that Ghana, and most of the rest of Africa, had never developed the class distinctions which Karl Marx and Vladimir Lenin saw in Europe and thus reform could reestablish preexisting egalitarianism suited to a post-colonial context. Nkrumah wrote that:
But  when  this  passage  carries  one  through  colonialism  the  reform  is  revolutionary  since  the  passage  from  colonialism  to  genuine  independence  is  an  act  of  revolution. But  because  of  the  continuity  of  communalism  with  socialism,  in  communalistic society, socialism is not a revolutionary creed, but a restatement in  contemporary idiom of the principles underlying communalism.
He would change this idea after the 1966 coup seeing revolution as increasingly necessary. Second, while Nkrumah believed in the materialism and economic determinism of Marxism, he argued that focusing on the economic system was only appropriate after achieving independence throughout Africa and that the political struggle was the first order in colonial and neocolonial contexts.

Impact 
The ideology of Nkrumaism formed a key part of the personality cult around Nkrumah and the party-building efforts of his political party, the CPP. This was in part achieved through Nkrumah's use of democratic centralism in the CPP and government. His arguments were widely published and these had an impact within the Gold Coast colony, independent Ghana, and other parts of Africa in the 1950s and 1960s. The CPP, founded by Nkrumah in 1949, became a vocal proponent for the teaching and application of Nkrumaism. When he became president in the 1960s, his Minister for Presidential Affairs, Tawia Adamafio, established study groups on Nkrumahism which many civil servants joined to advance their careers. At the same time, the CPP established Ghana Young Pioneers groups for school age children where Nkrumaism was taught. While the tenets were promoted through these various party efforts, applying all aspects of the ideology proved to be difficult for Nkrumah while President of the country. Because of this, some consider Nkrumaism to be "first of all a cultural phenomenon" in Ghana with little impact on the actual politics of the country.

Criticisms 
Henry Bretton argues that Nkrumaism was not a coherent ideology, but a vague framework supporting the cult of personality and the centralized rule of Nkrumah. He writes: 
In contrast, Yuri Smertin criticized early works by Nkrumah from a Marxist perspective for distorting scientific socialism by combining religious and traditional elements.

See also 
African Review
 African socialism
 Black Power
 Garveyism
 Lumumbism
 Mobutism
 Sankarism

References

Bibliography

External links

 
Eponymous political ideologies
Politics of Ghana
Socialism in Africa
Socialism in Ghana
Types of socialism